The Fatal Accidents Act 1846 (9 & 10 Vict. c.93), commonly known as Lord Campbell's Act, was an Act of the Parliament of the United Kingdom, that, for the first time in England and Wales, allowed relatives of people killed by the wrongdoing of others to recover damages.

Background
Under the common law of England and Wales, the death of a person causes solely emotional and pure economic loss to their relatives. In general, damages cannot be recovered for either type of damage, only for physical damage to the claimant or their property. This was the rule declared by the court in Baker v. Bolton (1808). Scottish law was different in that the court could grant a solatium in acknowledgment of the family's grief.

Thus, if a person was injured through a tort, the wrongdoer would be liable for causing injury. If the person were killed, there would be no liability. Perversely, the wrongdoer had a financial interest in killing, rather than injuring, a victim.

However, during the 1830s the rapid development of the railways led to increasing public hostility to the epidemic of railway deaths and the indifferent attitudes of the railway companies. As a result, inquest juries started to revive the ancient remedy of deodands as a way of penalizing the railways. The railway accident at Sonning Cutting (1841) was particularly notorious. This alerted legislators, in particular Lord Campbell and the Select committee on Railway Labourers (1846). In the face of railway opposition, Campbell introduced a bill in 1845, along with a bill to abolish deodands. The latter proposal, which became law as the Deodands Act 1846, to some extent mitigated railway hostility.

The Act
The Act came into effect in August 1846 and gave personal representatives the right to bring a legal action for damages where the deceased person had such a right at the time of their death. Compensation was restricted to the husband, parent, or child of the deceased and was for "such damages ... proportioned to the injury resulting from such death." The wording left the question of how damages were to be assessed. In Franklin v. South Eastern Railway (1858), Baron Pollock held that the Act did not grant a Scottish-style solatium but solely damages for economic loss.

Repeal
The Act was variously amended and finally repealed by Schedule 2 of the Fatal Accidents Act 1976 which governs fatal accident compensation and is based on similar principles. Limited compensation for a family's grief was finally granted by the Administration of Justice Act 1982, section 3.

International inspirations
Similar legislation has since been brought into force throughout the English-speaking world. For example, part 3 of the Wrongs Act 1958 of Victoria, Australia is often referred to as a Lord Campbell's Act.

See also
Fatal Accidents Act

References

Bibliography

Acts of the Parliament of the United Kingdom concerning England and Wales
1846 in British law
United Kingdom Acts of Parliament 1846
Legal history of England
Repealed United Kingdom Acts of Parliament